Events from the year 1252 in Ireland.

Incumbent
Lord: Henry III

Events
Founding of Claregalway Friary
8 August – by charter of Henry III of England, Maud de Lacy, Baroness Geneville and her husband Geoffrey de Geneville, 1st Baron Geneville, are granted rights in the lands in the eastern part of the Lordship of Meath surrounding Trim Castle which previously belonged to her grandfather, Walter de Lacy.

Births

Deaths

References

 
1250s in Ireland
Ireland
Years of the 13th century in Ireland